Baptism (full title Krst pod Triglavom - Baptism Below Triglav) is soundtrack album by Laibach. It is the soundtrack to the Neue Slowenische Kunst production of the same name.  All music and lyrics by Laibach, except where noted.

Track listing

LP 
The 2LP version (released as a box with the two records, an LP-sized booklet and two posters) has the following tracks:

819-822:
 "Hostnik"
 "Jezero" (Lake)
 "Valjhun"
 "Delak"
 "Koža" (Skin)
1095-1270:
 "Jägerspiel" (Hunters' Game)
 "Bogomila - Verführung" (Bogomila - Seduction)
 "Wienerblut" (Viennese Blood)

1961-1982:
 "Črtomir"
 "Jelengar"
 "Apologija Laibach" (Laibach Apology)
1983-1987:
 "Herzfeld" (Heartfield)
 "Krst" (Baptism)
 "Germania"
 "Rdeči pilot" (Red Pilot)

CD 
The CD version has the same songs (except "Hostnik", which is only on the 2LP), but with slightly different - incorrect - track divisions:

 "Jezero/Valjhun/Delak" – 11:00
 "Koža" – 3:57
 "Jägerspiel" – 7:25
 "Bogomila - Verführung" – 3:54
 "Wienerblut" – 7:00
 "Črtomir" – 4:51
 "Jelengar" – 2:41
 "Apologija Laibach" – 12:24
 "Herzfeld" – 4:48
 "Krst, Germania" – 12:50
 "Rdeči pilot" – 1:00

Notes

External links 
 Krst pod Triglavom, The Unofficial Laibach Site.

1986 soundtrack albums
Laibach (band) albums